Kollbrunn railway station is a railway station in the Swiss canton of Zürich. The station is situated in the village of Kollbrunn within the municipality of Zell. It is located on the Tösstalbahn between Winterthur and Rapperswil, and is served by Zürich S-Bahn lines S11 and S26.

References

External links 

Kollbrunn station on Swiss Federal Railway's web site

Railway stations in the canton of Zürich
Swiss Federal Railways stations